105th Street may refer to:

105 Street, Edmonton, Alberta, Canada
105th Street station, New York City, United States